Bob Hope School is a charter school system in Port Arthur, Texas. It has four campuses, Bob Hope Elementary Campus, Bob Hope Middle School, Bob Hope High School and Bob Hope High School in Beaumont, Texas.  It is currently seeking to open a 5th campus in Baytown, Texas

In November 2007 the Texas State Board of Education approved the school's establishment. The school planned to have all classes move to the Hughen Building, which has  of space. Its initial student capacity was to be 250.

By 2010 there were plans to expand the capacity by 250 students.

References

External links
 Bob Hope School

Public high schools in Texas
High schools in Jefferson County, Texas
Charter schools in Texas
Schools in Jefferson County, Texas
Port Arthur, Texas